Drama is a 2012 Indian Kannada romantic comedy thriller written, directed and co-produced by Yogaraj Bhat under the banner Yogaraj Movies and Jayanna Combines. It stars Yash, Radhika Pandit, Sathish Ninasam and Sindhu Lokanath in leading roles and veteran actor Ambareesh in an extended cameo appearance.

Music for the film was scored by V. Harikrishna while lyrics for the soundtrack were written by the successful combination of Jayanth Kaikini and Yogaraj Bhat. Krishna was hired as the cinematographer for the film, who had previously worked with Bhat in the massively successful film, Mungaru Male.

Cast

 Yash as Venkatesha
 Radhika Pandit as Nandini
 Sathish Ninasam as 'Kwatle' Satisha
 Sindhu Lokanath as Chandrika
 Sampath as D'Souza
 Suchendra Prasad as Shalivahana, college principal
 Malavika as Gayathri
 Lohithaswa as D'Souza's boss
 Achyuth Kumar as Venkatesha's father
 Rajashekhar Naidu 
 Sai Mahesh 
 M. S. Umesh 
 Rockline Venkatesh 
 Sangeetha 
 Ravi Santhehaklu 
 Bangalore Nagesh 
 Abhinaya 
 Kalyani Girish 
 Mithra
 Honnavalli Krishna
 Rockline Sudhakar as Chandrika's father
 Hamsa as Ganga
 Ambareesh in a cameo appearance as Bulbul

Production
After the moderate success of Paramathma, the last venture of Yogaraj Bhat, this was the second project for the production house, Jayanna Combines. Hindi and Marathi cinema actor Atul Kulkarni was picked for the negative role after Prakash Rai, who was the original choice for the role. He was again replaced by Tamil actor Sampath Raj. V Harikrishna scored the music and background score. S Krishna, who previously worked on Mungaru Male, conducted camera work. Drama is produced by Jayanna and Bhogendra.

Soundtrack
The music of the film was composed by V. Harikrishna. The audio album was released in the end of September, 2012 and was well received. "Thundh Haikla Sahavasa" was a huge hit.

Awards
 Yogaraj Bhat - Won -Filmfare Award for Best Lyricist – Kannada category for the song 'Bombe Adsonu'.
 V. Harikrishna - Won -Filmfare Award for Best Music Director – Kannada category
 Sonu Nigam - Won -The Bangalore Times Film Awards for 'The Best Playback Singer Male' category for the song 'Chendutiya Pakkadali'.
 Yogaraj Bhat - Won -The Bangalore Times Film Awards for 'The Best Lyricist' category for the song 'Bombe Adsonu'.
 Sonu Nigam - Nominated -Filmfare Award for Best Male Playback Singer – Kannada category for the song 'Chendutiya Pakkadali'
 Nominated for Filmfare Award for Best Film – Kannada category
 Yash - Nominated for Filmfare Award for Best Actor – Kannada category
 Sindhu Lokanath -Nominated for Filmfare Award for Best Supporting Actress – Kannada category
 Nominated for The Bangalore Times Film Awards for 'The Best Film' category 
 Nominated for The Bangalore Times Film Awards for 'The Best Youth Film' category
 V. Harikrishna - Nominated -The Bangalore Times Film Awards for 'The Best Singer Male' Category

Critical reception

A critic from The Times of India scored the film at 3.5 out of 5 stars and says "Full marks to Yash for a lively performance. Radhika Pandit has done a neat job. V Harikrishna walks away with honours for his excellent numbers. Krishna’s cinematography is pleasing to the eye". Srikanth Srinivasa from Rediff.com wrote "Krishna's camera work is good while Harikrishna's music is a winner. The title song, Bombe aadisuvanu and Tundu Haikala Sawasa are already popular. Drama could have been a little more dramatic but is worth a watch for all the entertainment the young team gives us". Shruti I. L. from DNA wrote "Krishna’s cinematography also does justice to the script. This is one drama you would want to be a part of... but just make sure you don’t bunk your classes to do so as the film comes precisely with one such message". A critic from News18 India wrote "'Drama' is a film that genuine Kannada film audience can not miss. It may have its pitfalls, yet it bears the stamp of Yogaraj Bhat's talents. Watch it!". A critic from The Hindu wrote "Bhat has tried his best to please both the classes and masses with homilies, stereotypes, emotions, suspense and scenic locales. A bit more effort on his part and he would come up with a satisfying thriller. Though the first half meanders, the narration picks up in the second half enough to be compelling. Drama unfolds within".

Box office
Drama got a good opening upon release. The film went on to become one of the highest grossers of 2012 by completing 100 days of run and grossing 20 Crore against its 4 Crore budget and was declared as a Blockbuster.

Accolades

Overseas release
Drama was premiered in USA. Drama was also premiered in UAE. Drama was also screened in Germany.

References

External links
 

2012 films
2010s Kannada-language films
Indian romantic comedy films
2012 romantic comedy films
Films scored by V. Harikrishna
Films directed by Yogaraj Bhat
Indian comedy thriller films
2010s comedy thriller films